Bristol-Myers Tele-Varieties is a TV series broadcast on WNBT-TV beginning in December 1946, and then began broadcasting on the NBC Television Network on January 5, 1947, on Sunday evenings from 8:15 to 8:30pm ET. The show, including interviews of celebrities, was hosted by the wife-and-husband team of Jinx Falkenburg and Tex McCrary.

Falkenburg went on to host many radio and TV shows, including The Swift Home Service Club, a Monday through Friday show that debuted in May 1947.

See also
1946-47 United States network television schedule

External links
Bristol-Myers Tele-Varieties at IMDB

NBC original programming
1947 American television series debuts
1947 American television series endings
Black-and-white American television shows
English-language television shows